Elliot R. Wolfson (born November 23, 1956) is a scholar of Jewish studies.

Wolfson earned B.A. and M.A. degrees in philosophy at Queens College of the City University of New York, and M.A. and Ph.D. degrees in Near Eastern and Judaic studies from Brandeis University, where he trained under the supervision of Alexander Altmann.

Wolfson is the Marsha and Jay Glazer Endowed Chair in Jewish Studies at the University of California, Santa Barbara. He was previously the Abraham Lieberman Professor of Hebrew and Judaic studies at New York University (1987–2014).

His main area of scholarly research is the history of Jewish mysticism but he has brought to bear on that field training in philosophy, literary criticism, feminist theory, postmodern hermeneutics, Eastern mystical traditions, and the phenomenology of religion. He is also considered to be "the leading scholarly interpreter" of the late Rabbi Menachem Mendel Schneerson, influential former leader of the Lubavitch Hasidic dynasty.

He has also published three volumes of poetry (drawn from the collection of poems he has amassed for decades called Preparations for Death) and he has had a gallery show of his paintings. Wolfson has served as the editor of the Journal of Jewish Thought and Philosophy since its inception in 1992. He has also served on various editorial boards for book series and journals.

Wolfson's son, Elijah Wolfson, was formerly a senior editor at Newsweek. and is now a senior editor at Time.

Honors and awards 
Wolfson's publications have won prestigious awards such as the American Academy of Religion's Award for Excellence in the Study of Religion in the Category of Historical Studies in 1995, the American Academy of Religion's Award for Excellence in Constructive and Reflective Studies in 2012.

Wolfson won two National Jewish Book Awards in the Scholarship category, in 1995 for Through a Speculum That Shines and in 2005 for Language, Eros, Being: Kabbalistic Hermeneutics and Poetic Imagination.

Additionally, Wolfson has been the recipient of several academic honors and awards:

 The Regenstein Visiting Professor in Jewish Studies in the Divinity School, University of Chicago (1992); 
 Visiting Professor in the Russian State University in the Humanities (1995); 
 Fellow at the Institute for Advanced Study, Princeton, New Jersey (1996);
 Shoshana Shier Distinguished Visiting Professor, University of Toronto (1998); 
 Fellow at the Institute for Advanced Studies, Hebrew University (2000, 2008–2009); 
 Crown-Minnow Visiting Professor of Theology and Jewish Studies, University of Notre Dame (2002); 
 Brownstone Visiting Professor of Jewish Studies, Dartmouth College (2003); 
 Visiting Professor in the Humanities Center, Johns Hopkins University (2005); 
 Professor of Jewish Mysticism in Shandong University, Jinan, China (2005); 
 Lynette S. Autrey Visiting Professor, Humanities Research Center, Rice University (2007); 
 Fellow at the Katz Center for Advanced Judaic Studies at the University of Pennsylvania (2012);
 Weinstock Visiting Professor of Jewish Studies, Harvard University (2016). 
 He has also taught at Cornell University, Queens College, Princeton University, Jewish Theological Seminary of America, Reconstructionist Rabbinical College, Hebrew Union College, Bard College, and Columbia University.

Wolfson is a fellow of the American Academy of Arts and Sciences, the American Academy of Jewish Research, and the American Society for the Study of Religion.

Bibliography 

History

 The Book of the Pomegranate: Moses de Leon's Sefer ha-Rimmon (Scholars Press, 1988)
 Through the Speculum That Shines: Vision and Imagination in Medieval Jewish Mysticism (Princeton University Press, 1994)
 Along the Path: Studies in Kabbalistic Hermeneutics, Myth, and Symbolism (State University of New York Press, 1995)
 Circle in the Square: Studies in the Use of Gender in Kabbalistic Symbolism (State University of New York Press, 1995)
 Abraham Abulafia—Kabbalist and Prophet: Hermeneutics, Theosophy, and Theurgy (Cherub Press, 2000)
 Language, Eros, and Being: Kabbalistic Hermeneutics and the Poetic Imagination (Fordham University Press, 2005)
 Alef, Mem, Tau: Kabbalistic Musings on Time, Truth, and Death (University of California Press, 2006)
 Venturing Beyond: Law and Morality in Kabbalistic Mysticism (Oxford University Press, 2006)
 Luminal Darkness: Imaginal Gleanings From Zoharic Literature (Oneworld Publications, 2007)
 Open Secret: Postmessianic Messianism and the Mystical Revision of Menahem Mendel Schneerson (Columbia University Press, 2009)
A Dream Interpreted Within a Dream: Oneiropoiesis and the Prism of Imagination (Zone Books, 2011)
 Giving Beyond the Gift: Apophasis and Overcoming Theomania (Fordham University Press, 2014)
 Elliot Wolfson: Poetic Thinking, edited by Hava Tirosh-Samuelson and Aaron W. Hughes (Brill, 2015)
 The Duplicity of Philosophy's Shadow: Heidegger, Nazism, and the Jewish Other (Columbia University Press, 2018)
 Heidegger and Kabbalah: Hidden Gnosis and the Path of Poiesis (Indiana University Press, 2019)
 Suffering Time: Philosophical, Kabbalistic, and Ḥasidic Reflections on Temporality (Brill, 2021)
 The Philosophical Pathos of Susan Taubes: Between Nihilism and Hope (Stanford University Press, 2023)

Edited books

 Perspectives on Jewish Thought and Mysticism, edited with Alfred Ivry and Alan Arkush (Harwood Academic Publishers, 1998)
 Rending the Veil: Concealment and Secrecy in the History of Religions (Seven Bridges Press, 1999)
 Suffering Religion, edited with Robert Gibbs (Routledge, 2002)
 New Directions in Jewish Philosophy, edited with Aaron Hughes (Indiana University Press, 2009)
 Studies in Medieval Jewish Intellectual and Social History: Festschrift in Honor of Robert Chazan, edited with David Engel and Lawrence H. Schiffman (Brill, 2012)
 D. G. Leahy and the Thinking Now Occurring, edited with Lissa McCullough (State University of New York Press, 2021)

Poetry
 Pathwings: Poetic-Philosophic Reflections on the Hermeneutics of Time and Language (Station Hill Press, 2004)
 Footdreams and Treetales: 92 Poems (Fordham University Press, 2007)
 Unveiling the Veil of Unveiling: Philosophical Aphorisms and Poems on Time, Language, Being, and Truth (Panui, 2021)

References

External links
Faculty page

1956 births
Living people
21st-century American historians
21st-century American male writers
American male poets
Dartmouth College faculty
Fellows of the American Academy of Arts and Sciences
Johns Hopkins University faculty
Jewish historians
Judaic scholars
Jewish philosophers
New York University faculty
Princeton University faculty
Rice University faculty
Academic staff of Shandong University
University of Chicago faculty
University of Notre Dame faculty
Academic staff of the University of Toronto
Hermeneutists
American male non-fiction writers